Olympic Sports Complex may refer to:

Athens Olympic Sports Complex in Greece, created following the 2004 Summer Olympics
Lake Placid Olympic Sports Complex in the United States, created following the 1980 Winter Olympics